Tomahawk is an American comic book character whose adventures were published by DC Comics during the 1940s, 1950s and 1960s as a backup feature in Star Spangled Comics and World's Finest Comics and in his own eponymous series. He was created by writer Joe Samachson and artist Edmond Good, and first appeared in Star-Spangled Comics #69 (June 1947). Tomahawk's uniqueness stems in part from the time frame of his adventures: the American Revolutionary War.

Publication history 
Tomahawk was a backup feature in Star Spangled Comics from his first appearance, issue #69 (June 1947) to issue #130 (July 1952), and in World's Finest Comics from issue #33 (Mar. 1948) until issue #101 (May 1959).  

The Tomahawk series premiered in September 1950, and lasted 140 issues, until June 1972. Most stories during this period were by writer France Herron and artist Fred Ray. The last ten issues of Tomahawk were titled Son of Tomahawk, featuring the character's son, Hawk Haukins, but the change did not slow the dropping sales which led to the book's cancellation.

Fictional character biography
Known as either Tom Hawk or Thomas Haukins, depending on which of two versions of his published history the reader prefers, "Tomahawk" was a soldier who served under George Washington in the warfare between the British, French and Iroquois forces during the decades prior to the American Revolutionary War. He acquired his nickname due to the resemblance between his birth name and a trademark weapon of the Iroquois Confederacy's warriors, and to the skill he developed with that weapon. He's assisted by a young white friend, Dan Hunter.

He subsequently achieved further fame as one of Washington's most capable operatives during the Revolution itself, leading a band of soldiers under the informal nickname of "Tomahawk's Rangers". 

In issues #35 and #36 (Sept.–Nov. 1955), Tomahawk met a young Davy Crockett, who was very popular at the time. However, this was a historical error, as Crockett (1786–1836) was not born until after the Revolutionary War.

Issue #81 was also notable, introducing Miss Liberty (Bess Lynn), one of the earliest patriotic superheroes by the vague internal chronology of the DC Universe, who would make several more appearances in the series. Liberty Belle is a descendant of hers.

In the Time Masters mini-series, it is established that Tomahawk's associate Dan Hunter is actually Rip Hunter's cousin who travels back in time to stop the Illuminati during the Revolutionary War, deciding to stay in the past. 

In 1998, Tomahawk appeared in a Vertigo Visions one-shot, written by Rachel Pollack. This issue retold his origin.

In 2008, he is featured in Bruce Jones' The War that Time Forgot.

During his quest to find a special stone, Haukins met and married an Apache princess named Moon Fawn, with whom he had two sons; Hawk and Small Eagle.

A new version of Tomahawk appeared in All-Star Western, Vol. 3, #13.

In other media
A version of Tomahawk appeared in the 1991 Swamp Thing TV series, voiced by Harvey Atkin. He is a Native American ally to the Swamp Thing that battles the Un-Men.

References

External links
 Cover gallery
 Tomahawk at Don Markstein's Toonopedia

1947 comics debuts
1972 comics endings
American comics
DC Comics characters
Characters created by Joseph Samachson
Comics by Carl Wessler
Comics by Robert Kanigher
Comics characters introduced in 1947
DC Comics military personnel
DC Comics titles
DC Comics Western (genre) characters
DC Comics male characters
Fictional American people
Fictional American Revolutionary War veterans
Fictional axefighters
Fictional hunters
Fictional soldiers
Golden Age adventure heroes
Comics set during the American Revolutionary War